Tonga 'Uli'uli Fifita (born 10 February 1959) is a Tongan professional wrestler, best known for his appearances in the World Wrestling Federation (WWF) and New Japan Pro-Wrestling (NJPW) as Haku. He is also known for his time in World Championship Wrestling (WCW), where he wrestled under the name Meng. In the WWF, he also wrestled under the names King Tonga and King Haku. Fifita appeared on multiple pay-per-view events for the WWF and WCW and is a former WWF World Tag Team Champion.

Sumo wrestling career
Growing up on the main island of the South Pacific island-kingdom of Tonga, Fifita attended Tonga College, where he played rugby union. At the age of 15, he was part of a group of six teenagers and young men sent by the king of Tonga to Japan to study Sumo. Sione Vailahi, who would later become better known as pro-wrestler "The Barbarian", was also a part of this group. He made his debut in November 1974 and reached the rank of Makushita 27. However, in 1975 the stablemaster who recruited him died, and he and the other five Tongan wrestlers got entangled in a dispute with his successor, which led to him being forced to retire by the Japan Sumo Association in 1976.

Professional wrestling career

Early career (1978–1986)
Under the guidance of two other former sumotori who had turned to puroresu, Genichiro Tenryu and Takashi Ishikawa, he joined their home promotion, All Japan Pro Wrestling. Early in his career, he also refereed matches in the Amarillo territory. Nevertheless, this merely served as a springboard for him to wrestle all over the world.

In the early 1980s, Fifita, taking the name King Tonga, wrestled in Canada for Frank Valois' International Wrestling promotion based in Montreal. The heel Tonga was managed by former wrestler Tarzan "The Boot" Tyler. Tonga feuded with the top stars of the promotion, including Dino Bravo. A face turn appeared to be in the offing, as Tonga interfered in a tag match, attacking Road Warrior Animal and Paul Ellering during a bout with Jos LeDuc and Jacques Rougeau, Jr. A miscommunication in another tag match with partner Butch Reed led to Reed and Tyler attacking Tonga. He worked in Puerto Rico for the World Wrestling Council where he feuded with Invader 1 and won many titles such as the WWC North American Tag Team Championship with El Gran Apolo, The WWC World Tag Team Championship with Hercules Hernandez and the WWC Puerto Rico Heavyweight Championship. Tonga formed a team with his until-then rival Dino Bravo, and the two became successful, including a win over The Road Warriors at the Montreal Forum.

World Wrestling Federation (1986–1992)

The Islanders (1986–1988)

In 1986, King Tonga, in his rookie year in the World Wrestling Federation, became a star by bodyslamming Big John Studd on Championship Wrestling, though predictably Studd's manager Bobby "The Brain" Heenan didn't pay him the US$15,000 he promised to anyone who could do so. He made a name for himself as Haku in the WWF as half of "The Islanders" with Tama. Originally a fan-favorite team, The Islanders had mixed success, though they did win a $50,000 tag team Battle Royal at Madison Square Garden in October 1986. They turned heel in 1987 during a match on the WWF Superstars of Wrestling with The Can-Am Connection (Tom Zenk and Rick Martel). Earlier in the show heel manager Bobby Heenan had announced he would have a new tag team that night and everyone thought he was going to introduce a new team to the WWF. Instead he showed up at ringside during the match where it became known his "new" team was in fact The Islanders. A feud thus broke out between the Islanders and the Connection; when Zenk left the WWF, Martel and replacement partner Tito Santana, as Strike Force continued the war, with the Islanders challenging Strike Force for the WWF World Tag Team Championship after the latter team won the belts. The team also had a classic feud with The British Bulldogs that was started when the Islanders, along with Bobby Heenan, kidnapped the Bulldogs' mascot, a bulldog named Matilda. Their feud ended after a 6-man tag team match at WrestleMania IV where The Islanders and Heenan (wearing an attack dog outfit) defeated the Bulldogs and Koko B. Ware when Heenan pinned Koko.

King Haku (1988–1989) 
In 1988, following King Harley Race's legitimate stomach injury sustained in a match against Hulk Hogan, Haku was given Race's crown and robe and was rechristened King Haku during a coronation ceremony. In one of his first big matches after becoming King Haku, he would face Hulk Hogan with Miss Elizabeth in Hogan's corner on Saturday Night's Main Event in October 1988. He challenged Randy Savage for the WWF World Heavyweight Championship on December 17 at  The Spectrum but failed to win the title. However he would cement his position as king by successfully defending his crown against the returning Race in a match at the 1989 Royal Rumble at The Summit in Houston. He would later lose the crown to Hacksaw Jim Duggan who himself was crowned as "King Duggan".

Colossal Connection (1989–1990) 

Haku would later go on to form the tag team known as the Colossal Connection with André the Giant and win the WWF Tag Team Championship from Demolition on 30 December edition of Superstars (taped on 13 December). Haku and André lost the titles at WrestleMania VI, when Demolition defeated the Colossal Connection to regain the titles. Haku never legally tagged Andre into the match (due to André's poor health). Late in the match André attempted to interfere, but Haku accidentally struck him with a savate kick which left André tied in the ropes; Haku was pinned shortly after this. The team's manager, Bobby Heenan, blamed André for the loss and even slapped the Giant, who retaliated by "paint-brushing" Heenan. Haku tried to ambush André; however, The Giant blocked Haku's kick and struck him repeatedly before leaving the ring alone to a standing ovation. André's face turn meant that the team had split.

Various feuds and departure (1990–1992) 
Just after WrestleMania, Haku became the first wrestler to challenge the new WWF champion, The Ultimate Warrior, but he lost the match. Later that month he was programmed into a house show program with Hercules. On a match that aired on 8 June 1990 MSG Network, Hercules defeated Haku. In matches through April and May, the former Heenan family member won most of his matches against Haku. In the summer of 1990 Haku transitioned to an opening card wrestler on the house show circuit. He was victorious against the returning Brady Boone, Jim Brunzell, Barry O, and the newly arrived Shane Douglas. After being left off of SummerSlam 90, Haku was first to be granted a series of matches against new Intercontinental Champion Kerry Von Erich in a series of house show matches in September. Winless in these matches, he then became part of the Heenan Family feud against The Big Boss Man and participated in the 1990 Survivor Series. Again winless, he moved on that fall to feud with the newly returned Davey Boy Smith. Haku ended the year mired in a lengthy losing streak.

In early 1991 he formed a tag team shortly after this with fellow Heenan Family member The Barbarian. Their most notable match was a defeat in the opening match of WrestleMania VII against The Rockers (Shawn Michaels and Marty Jannetty). The team was short lived and Haku returned to singles competition, facing the newly returned Ricky Steamboat on house shows the spring of 1991. In the summer of 1991 Haku began to appear in Super World Sports in Japan for joint WWF/SWS cards. Shortly after competing in the Royal Rumble in 1992, Haku left the WWF to compete exclusively in SWS.

Japan and Mexico (1992–1994)
Coming towards the end of Fifita's WWF career, he would wrestle under the name King Haku for Japanese promotion Super World of Sports. On 14 February 1992, Haku and Yoshiaki Yatsu became the first SWS Tag Team Champions. They lost the championship on 16 April when they lost them to George and Shunji Takano but would regain them on 18 April, holding them until 19 June when SWS closed. With SWS closing, King Haku wrestled for Consejo Mundial de Lucha Libre in Mexico and New Japan Pro-Wrestling and Wrestle Association R in Japan, before finally joining World Championship Wrestling.

World Championship Wrestling (1994–2001)

Dungeon of Doom and Faces of Fear (1994–1997) 
In WCW, (because the name Haku was trademarked by the WWF) Fifita wrestled as Meng. He was initially portrayed as the mysterious and intimidating bodyguard of Col. Rob Parker, wearing business suits and shades while maintaining a quiet demeanor. His last night as a bodyguard was at SuperBrawl V when Hacksaw Jim Duggan wrestled Bunkhouse Buck; after the match, Meng attacked Duggan. Later in the event when Blacktop Bully was scheduled to wrestle Dustin Rhodes, WCW Commissioner Nick Bockwinkel came out and escorted Meng back to the dressing room because of the attack on Duggan earlier in the show. The next week, Col. Parker announced that Meng will no longer be a bodyguard, but will be a wrestler from now on, winning his first match against a jobber with one fast high kick. Teaming with Kurasawa, he feuded against Sting and Road Warrior Hawk after the feud he was called "The Monster" Meng.

Later, he faced Sting in a losing effort for the vacated United States title at the 1995 Great American Bash. Meng later joined the Dungeon of Doom under the name "Face of Terror" and forming a tag team named the Faces of Fear with his previous WWF tag team partner The Barbarian, with the pair being managed by another former WWF alumnus, Jimmy Hart. He was touted as being a former bodyguard to the Emperor of Japan and was initially called The Monster. Meng's finishing maneuver was the Tongan Death Grip, a nerve grip on the Adam's apple applied to a standing victim who would drop into a supine position.

Hardcore Champion (1997–2001) 
Meng spent much of 1997 facing lower and mid-card performers before starting a small winning streak in the summer of 1998. This led to a main event WCW World Championship match with Bill Goldberg on 10 August edition of Monday Nitro. Goldberg, too, had an impressive winning streak. Goldberg won and retained his title that night and thus added another wrestler in his winning streak, making it 160–0. Prior to this, Meng had faced Goldberg (before he won the World Championship) on WCW Saturday Night and despite the loss had pushed Goldberg for longer than anyone had until that point. In the spring of 1999, when Ric Flair was the (kayfabe) president on WCW programming, the barbaric Meng would often annihilate Flair's enemies per his instructions. Later on, Meng had a short-lived feud with Sting and occasionally faced top stars like Lex Luger and WCW Champion Bret Hart. He also participated in matches for the newly introduced WCW Hardcore Championship toward the end of 1999. Meng finally won the title at the Sin pay-per-view on 14 January 2001. He became the final WCW Hardcore Champion. A week later, he left WCW just weeks before it was bought by WWF in March 2001.

Independent circuit (2000–2016)
Fifita, under the name Meng, wrestled for World League Wrestling winning the WLW Heavyweight Championship on two occasions in 2000. He would return in 2003 to win the championship for the third time. Since 2003, Fifita has been essentially retired, returning to the wrestling ring on a few occasions over the years. In 2009, as King Haku, he would wrestle regularly for World Xtreme Wrestling where he won the WXW Hardcore Championship twice. He would return to semi retirement after his stint. Meng appeared at Chikara's King of Trios 2012 tournament, held on 14–16 September in Easton, Pennsylvania, teaming with The Barbarian and The Warlord under the team name the Faces of Pain. On 14 September, the team was eliminated from the tournament in the first round by Team ROH (Mike Bennett and Matt Jackson and Nick Jackson).

Return to WWF (2001–2002)
One week after Sin, Fifita returned to the WWF as Haku and made a surprise appearance at the 2001 Royal Rumble. After the Rumble, he formed a tag team with Rikishi, but the team did not last long due to Rikishi suffering an injury. Haku was left to wrestle on the lower card shows like Sunday Night Heat. His final TV taping was against Shawn Stasiak on a WWF Jakked taping in Buffalo, New York on 23 July 2001 which Stasiak won. Haku would work in WWF's developmental territory Heartland Wrestling Association. Haku's last matches were against WWF European Champion Diamond Dallas Page at house shows in February and March 2002 losing to all of them in Texas, New Mexico, Japan, Singapore and Malaysia. He was eventually released from the WWF in April 2002.

New Japan Pro-Wrestling (2016–2018)
On 4 January 2016, Fifita, as King Haku, made a surprise return to New Japan Pro-Wrestling, taking part in the New Japan Rumble on the Wrestle Kingdom 10 pre-show. During the appearance he represented his son Tama Tonga's Bullet Club stable. He was eliminated from the match after submitting to Hiroyoshi Tenzan. The following day, Haku teamed with his son and fellow Bullet Club members Doc Gallows, Karl Anderson and Yujiro Takahashi in a ten-man tag team match, where they defeated Hiroyoshi Tenzan, Kushida, Satoshi Kojima, Togi Makabe and Tomoaki Honma. Haku next appeared at NJPW's G1 Special in USA on 2 July 2017, alongside his sons.

Haku, once again representing Bullet Club, returned at the G1 Special in San Francisco. He, alongside 
Tama Tonga, Tanga Loa, Yujiro Takahashi and Chase Owens defeated  Chaos members Yoshi-Hashi, Gedo, Rocky Romero, Yoh and Sho, after making Gedo submit to the Tongan Death Grip. Later that night, Haku appeared with Tama Tonga and Tanga Loa after Kenny Omega successfully defended the IWGP Heavyweight Championship against Cody. They initially congratulated Omega, but suddenly turned and attacked Omega and the Young Bucks as they were celebrating on the ramp while wearing T-shirts referring to themselves as the "BC Firing Squad". After dragging Omega and the Young Bucks back to the ring to attack them further, fellow Bullet Club members Hangman Page, Marty Scurll, Yujiro Takahashi, and Chase Owens all attempted to come to The Elite's defence, but were summarily beaten down. The Firing Squad attempted to make peace with Cody, but Cody refused, and was also attacked. Haku then delivered a piledriver to Omega onto a steel chair, leaving the Firing Squad standing tall at the end as they declared themselves to be the real Bullet Club.

All Elite Wrestling (2021)
On 28 July 2021, Haku made a surprise appearance at All Elite Wrestling's (AEW) Fight for the Fallen event where he accompanied his son Hikuleo to the ring for his IWGP United States Heavyweight Championship match, where he faced Lance Archer in a losing effort.

Personal life
Fifita is married to Dorothy Koloamatangi. They have a daughter, Vika; a son, Tevita who is also a wrestler; and two adopted sons, Alipate and Taula. His son Tevita played football as a defensive end for the University of Texas at El Paso and was on the WWE roster from 2009 until 2014, as Camacho, and was also known as Micah in Total Nonstop Action Wrestling. Tevita and Alipate currently wrestle as Tanga Loa and Tama Tonga in New Japan Pro-Wrestling. Fifita's youngest son Taula made his professional wrestling debut in November 2016. He wrestles under the ring name Hikuleo previously, Leo Tonga. Among Fifita's cousins are former New England Patriots defensive tackle Steve Fifita and Australian Wallabies rugby international player Tatafu Polota-Nau. Meng made a cameo appearance in the 1978 Sylvester Stallone movie Paradise Alley along with many other professional wrestlers.

Legacy and reputation
Many former wrestling personalities have described Haku as the toughest or greatest legitimate fighter in wrestling, including Stone Cold Steve Austin, Road Warrior Animal, Perry Saturn, Barbarian and Warlord, Hulk Hogan, Rocky Johnson, The Rock, Rick Steiner, Arn Anderson, Goldberg, Big Van Vader, Fit Finlay, Mean Gene Okerlund, Ric Flair, Stu Hart, Rikishi, Frenchy Martin, Jim Cornette, Bob Holly, Dave Penzer, Gino Brito, J. J. Dillon, Sonny Onoo, and Hillbilly Jim.
 		
On 3 March 1989, Haku got into an altercation with some men at a Baltimore Airport bar who called wrestling "fake", and during the fight, Haku bit off the nose of one of the men. Haku stated, "Yeah. It was in Baltimore Airport...me and Siva Afi went over and there were lots of babyfaces there at the bar. So we went and sat in the other corner away from them. When they were ready to close, we had a few drinks, and on our way out there were five guys just sitting there. Of course, the same thing came out. The 'fake' stuff. 'Hey, are you guys with those guys – wrestlers? The fake wrestlers on TV?' You know. I said, 'Yeah. I'll show you.' And I reached over without thinking – there are four other guys there (laughs) – grabbed his face, and bit his nose off. Then the fight started. Me and Siva kind of cleaned house there and left. I'll never forget it."
 		
In a shoot interview Bobby Heenan talked extensively about Meng and referred to him as the toughest man he has ever met. The most extreme story he shared was in regards to a bar fight in which he claimed Meng "took his two fingers on his right hand, his index finger and trigger finger, and he reached into the guy's mouth and he broke off the guy's bottom teeth." Heenan said that if he hadn't been there and seen it himself, he wouldn't believe it. Heenan was also close friends with Andre the Giant and claimed that the only two men in the world that Andre feared were Meng and Harley Race. Heenan also praised Haku as a good-hearted family man.
 		
Kevin Sullivan told a story to WWE Classics about the time when he and Haku went to a tavern to grab a few beers before heading to their hotel. According to Sullivan, it was obvious that he and Meng weren't locals, so when they walked into the bar, a guy playing pool insulted Meng. "The next thing I know is that Meng goozles the guy like Mr. Spock," Sullivan said. "It was fast and furious. He then grabbed another guy who tried to get involved and knocked him unconscious." After that, things got even crazier. "Meng bit through the guy's shirt like a wolf, bit a chunk out of the guy's back, then spit it on the floor," he said. "I said, 'It's time to go.'" Sullivan said that as they drove from the bar he saw police cars pulling into the parking lot, but authorities didn't pursue them and no charges were ever filed.
 		
Wrestler Shane Douglas said in a shoot interview that one would be better off fighting the US Army than fighting Haku. He spoke about an incident when he witnessed several cops trying to hold Haku down and one of them struck Haku with a baton on his face while the others emptied their cans of mace on him but nothing seemed to faze Haku.

Championships and accomplishments
50th State Big Time Wrestling
NWA Hawaii Heavyweight Championship (1 time)
All Japan Pro Wrestling
2 January Korakuen Hall Heavyweight Battle Royal (1981)
Cauliflower Alley Club
Tag Team Award (2019) - with The Barbarian
Lutte Internationale
Canadian International Heavyweight Championship (1 time)
Canadian International Tag Team Championship (1 time) – with Richard Charland
Impact Pro Wrestling
 IPW New Zealand Tag Team Championship (1 time) – with Liger
North Carolina Wrestling Association
NCWA Tag Team Championship (1 time) – with The Barbarian
NWA Mid-America
NWA World Six-Man Tag Team Championship (1 time) – with Ken Lucas and George Gulas
Pro Wrestling Illustrated
Ranked No. 92 of the top 500 singles wrestlers in the PWI 500 in 1995
Ranked No. 330 of the top 500 singles wrestlers of the "PWI Years" in 2003
Super World of Sports
SWS Tag Team Championship (2 times) – with Yoshiaki Yatsu
Tokyo Sports
Effort Award (1980)
World Championship Wrestling
WCW Hardcore Championship (1 time)
World League Wrestling
WLW Heavyweight Championship (3 times)
World Wrestling Council
WWC North American Tag Team Championship (1 time) – with Gran Apolo
WWC Puerto Rico Heavyweight Championship (2 times)
WWC World Tag Team Championship (1 time) – with Hercules Ayala
World Wrestling Federation
WWF Tag Team Championship (1 time) – with André the Giant
 Slammy Award (1 time)
 Bobby "The Brain" Heenan Scholarship Award (1987) with André the Giant, Hercules, King Kong Bundy, Harley Race and Tama
World Xtreme Wrestling
WXW Hardcore Championship (2 times)
Wrestling Observer Newsletter
Worst Worked Match of the Year (1996)

Sumo Career Record

Media 
WCW/nWo Revenge (Video Game – 1998)
WCW/nWo Thunder (Video Game – 1998)
WWE Raw (Video Game – 2002)
WWE 2K16 (Video Game – 2015)

References

External links
Biography of Haku

TV.com summary

1959 births
20th-century professional wrestlers
21st-century professional wrestlers
Articles containing video clips
Bullet Club members
Expatriate professional wrestlers in Japan
Living people
People from Tongatapu
Professional wrestling managers and valets
The First Family (professional wrestling) members
The Heenan Family members
The Stud Stable members
Tongan actors
Tongan emigrants to the United States
Tongan expatriates in Japan
Tongan male professional wrestlers
Tongan sumo wrestlers
WWC Puerto Rico Champions
WWF/WWE King Crown's Champions/King of the Ring winners